Hywel ap Rhodri Molwynog as he was improperly called due to lack of knowledge of the genealogies by men like John Edward Lloyd, but in fact was Hywel ap Caradog was King of Gwynedd (reigned 816–825). He rose to power following a destructive dynastic struggle in which he deposed his cousin, King Cynan Dindaethwy ap Rhodri (reigned 798–816). During Hywel's reign Gwynedd's power was largely confined to Anglesey. It was a time of substantial territorial loss to Mercia.

Hywel is said to be the son of Rhodri Molwynog on the assumption that he was Cynan's brother, for example as stated in Lloyd's History of Wales, which does not cite its source. Sources such as the Annales Cambriae mention him by name only. The genealogy of Jesus College MS. 20 gives him as the son of Caradog ap Meirion, while it gives Cynan as the son of Rhodri Molwynog.

A destructive war between King Cynan and Hywel raged on Anglesey between 812 and 816, ultimately ending with Cynan's defeat and banishment, and Hywel's rise to the throne. Coenwulf of Mercia took advantage of Gwynedd's weakness in 817, occupying Rhufoniog (see map) and laying waste to the mountains of Eryri, the defensive stronghold of Gwynedd. In 818 there was a notable battle at Llanfaes on Anglesey. The combatants are not identified, but the site had been the llys of King Cynan.

Coastal Wales along the Dee Estuary was still in Mercian hands in 821, as it is known that Coenwulf died peacefully at Basingwerk in that year. In 823 Mercia laid waste to Powys and returned to Gwynedd to burn down Deganwy.

Hywel was the last King of Gwynedd in the male line of Cunedda Wledig. He would be succeeded by the eldest son of Essylt daughter of Cynan Dindaethwy and Gwriad King of Ynys Manaw who was named Merfyn Frych.

See also
Kings of Wales family trees

Notes

Citations

References 

825 deaths
Monarchs of Gwynedd
Year of birth unknown
9th-century Welsh monarchs